The Stereotypes are a production team created in 2003, comprising Jonathan Yip, Ray Romulus, Jeremy Reeves and Ray Charles McCullough II. In June 2010, they were listed among the "Top 10 Songwriters and Producers to Watch" in Billboard magazine.

The Stereotypes have produced many songs including Justin Bieber's platinum-selling "Somebody to Love" (feat. Usher), Cardi B and Bruno Mars "Please Me", Destiny Rogers' "Tomboy", Ne-Yo's "Year of the Gentleman", Mary J. Blige's "Good Love", Chris Brown's "Beg for It", Fifth Harmony's "Deliver", Lil Yachty's "Better", Iggy Azalea's "Mo Bounce" and Red Velvet's "Bad Boy".

The Stereotypes won two Grammy Awards in 2018, Song of the Year and Best R&B Song, for their work on Bruno Mars' 7× platinum, #1 Billboard Hot 100 song "That's What I Like". The Stereotypes took over the charts in 2017 with a string of songs from Mars' album 24K Magic, which swept the Grammys and won the Album of the Year and Best R&B Album awards. The Stereotypes' contributions to the album include production credits on "24K Magic" (which won the award for Record of the Year) andco-producing and co-writing "That's What I Like" and "Finesse". The Stereotypes were also nominated for a Grammy in the category of Producer of the Year (Non-Classical).

Production credits

Singles

Awards and nominations

Grammy Awards

|-
| rowspan="2"| 2009
| rowspan="2"| Year of the Gentleman
| Album of the Year
| 
|-
| | Best Contemporary R&B Album
| 
|-
| rowspan="3"| 2011
| The Love & War Masterpeace
| Best R&B Album
| 
|-
| Back to Me
| Best R&B Album
| 
|-
| My World 2.0
| Best Pop Vocal Album
| 
|-
| 2012
|F.A.M.E.
 
| Best R&B Album
| 
|-
| rowspan="3"| 2018
| rowspan="1"| The Stereotypes
| Producer of the Year, Non-Classical
| 
|-
|rowspan="2"| "That's What I Like" (Bruno Mars song)
|Best R&B Song
| 
|-
|Song of the Year
| 
|}

Korean Music Awards

|-
| 2018
| "Bad Boy" (Red Velvet song)
| Best Pop Song 
| 
|-

Notes

American record producers
Record production teams
American songwriting teams